Vasilyevka is a rural locality (a selo) and the administrative center of Vasilyevskoye Rural Settlement, Buturlinovsky District, Voronezh Oblast, Russia. The population was 1,001 as of 2010. There are 15 streets.

Geography 
Vasilyevka is located 36 km northeast of Buturlinovka (the district's administrative centre) by road. Kucheryayevka is the nearest rural locality.

References 

Rural localities in Buturlinovsky District